Kossouka is a department or commune of Yatenga Province in Burkina Faso.

References 

Departments of Burkina Faso
Yatenga Province